The Eastern Music Awards (EMA) is an award scheme specially created to honor excellence in creative art by Hi5 Entertainment. It is organized annually with support from PATER, Eastern MUSIGA and other stakeholders. The awards scheme see to put more focus on music for industry players from the Eastern Region of Ghana. The awards night every year features artists from Various parts of the Eastern Region. The 4th Edition of the Eastern Music Awards took place on Saturday, 19 December 2020.

Background
The Eastern Music Awards were launched in 2017, with the first event taking place in Koforidua on Saturday 8 October 2017.

Trophy/plaque 
The trophy/plaque presented to winners of the various categories has been modified and changed over the years. Currently, the trophy is made of an acrylic glass guitar with EMA on a wooden handle.

Nomination process 
Categories along with Definitions are out doored every year prior to Opening of Nomination. Artists, Managers, Record Labels and Stake Holders are educated on the categories before they file for nominations. Entries are received every year through the EMA official website (www.easternmusicawards.com).

Awards categories 

 Artist of the Year
 Hiplife/Hip Hop Act of the Year
 Song of the Year
 Hip Hop Song of the Year
 Promoter of the Year
 Collaboration of the Year
 Reggae-Dancehall Song of the Year
 Reggae-Dancehall Act of the Year
 Best Group of the Year
 Eastern International Act of the Year
 East-side Song of the Year
 Rap Act of the Year
 Most Promising Act of the Year
 Gospel Song of the Year
 Gospel Act of the Year
 Highlife Song of the Year
 Highlife Act of the Year
 Male Vocalist of the Year
 Female Vocalist of the Year
 Afropop Song of the Year
 Afropop Act of the Year
 Eastern Pride of the Year
 Most Influential Act of the Year
 Viral Song of the Year
 Sound Engineer of the Year
 Music Producer of the Year
 Music Video of the Year
 Video Director of the Year

Eastern Music Award for Artist of the Year 
Artist of the Year is the topmost award, given to the artist(s) adjudged by the Academy, Board and the general public as having the highest audience appeal and popularity. The artist(s) must have released a hit single/album during the year under review.

Artist of the Year award winners

 2017: Koo Ntakra
 2018: Kuami Eugene
 2019: Phada Gàza
 2020: Stone Gee

References 

Ghanaian music awards
Awards established in 2017
Annual events in Ghana